Crinum viviparum is a Monocot plant species in the family Amaryllidaceae; no subspecies are listed in the Catalogue of Life.

Distribution and description 
Crinum viviparum is widely distributed in Asia: from the Indian subcontinent to Indo-China.  In Vietnam names for this species include: nàng, nàng la gươm, and náng hoa đỏ.

Flowers may be  and white with pinkish margins.

Gallery

References

External links 
 
 

viviparum
Flora of Indo-China
Taxa named by Jean-Baptiste Lamarck